is a Japanese voice actor from Isesaki, Gunma Prefecture, Japan. He is affiliated with Mausu Promotion.

Filmography

Anime
2001
 Okojo-san (Hasegawa)
2003
 The Galaxy Railways (José Antonio Valdivia, Ōiwa)
2004
 Gokusen (Ohashi)
 Desert Punk (Haro Ōnami)
2005
 Elemental Gelade (Jimothy Cubege)
 Hell Girl (Hideo Yasuda, Goro Suetsugu)
 Basilisk (Jimushi Jubei)
2006
 009-1 (Apollo)
 Welcome to the N.H.K. (Hideo Nomura)
 Hell Girl: Two Mirrors (Heitaro Kenmochi, Shigeki Ozaki, Tanidenki, Sakuma)
 Ghost Hunt (Eijiro Yoshimi)
 Shōnen Onmyōji (Enki)
 A Spirit of the Sun (Terada)
 Tokyo Tribes (Batter Nori, Sasaki)
 Tokimeki Memorial Only Love (Fumihiko Kinosaki, Hiromi Akaboshi)
 Strain: Strategic Armored Infantry (Hobbs)
 Wan Wan Celeb Soreyuke! Tetsunoshin (John)
2007
 Big Windup! (Keisuke Yamanoi)
 Kono Aozora ni Yakusoku o (Masashi Fujimura)
 Skull Man (Jin Mamiya)
 Fantastic Detective Labyrinth (Gonji Suzuki)
 Toward the Terra (Helman, Romero)
 My Bride Is a Mermaid (Burio, Nagasumi's father)
 Baccano! (Dallas Geonard)
 Bamboo Blade (Akira Toyama)
2008
 S · A: Special A (Jiro Hanazono)
 Golgo 13 (Scott)
 Hell Girl: Three Vessels (Kengo Saegusa)
 Natsume's Book of Friends (Akagane)
 Nabari no Ou (Akatsuki Rokujō)
 Naruto: Shippuden (Fudo)
2009
 The Beast Player Erin (Karon)
 Sengoku Basara: Samurai Kings (Naoe Kanetsugu)
 Mazinger Edition Z: The Impact! (Detective Ankokuji)
2010
 Big Windup! Season 2 (Keisuke Yamanoi)
 Princess Jellyfish (Tsukimi's father)
 The Qwaser of Stigmata (Jackal)
 Sengoku Basara: Samurai Kings 2 (Naoe Kanetsugu)
 Durarara!! (Ran Izumii)
 The Legend of the Legendary Heroes (Claugh Klom)
 Fairy Tail (Cobra)
2011
 Kamisama Dolls (Murota)
 Maken-ki! (Gen Tagayashi)
2012
 Girls und Panzer (Shinzaburō)
 JoJo's Bizarre Adventure (Rudol von Stroheim)
2013
 Samurai Flamenco (Guillotine Gorilla)
 Tanken Driland (Jarudo)
 Haiyore! Nyaruko-san W (Zhar)
 Log Horizon (Demiquas)
2014
 Shōnen Hollywood (Kamiji)
 Jinsei (Fake Yoshitaka)
 Marvel Disk Wars: The Avengers (Joel Murphy, MODOK)
 Tenkai Knights (Slyger)
 Hamatora: The Animation (Haruo Edogawa)
 Maken-ki! Two (Gen Tagayashi)
 Encouragement of Climb: Second Season (Susuki)
 Log Horizon 2 (Demiquas)
2015
 Assassination Classroom (Smog)
 Kindaichi Case Files R Season 2 (Nemoto)
 Kuroko's Basketball 3 (Hideki Ishida)
 Subete ga F ni Naru (Satoshi Hasebe)
 Durarara!!x2 (Ran Izumii)
 Rampo Kitan: Game of Laplace (Sunaga)
 Lupin the Third Part 4 (Romeo)
 One-Punch Man (Tank-Top Blackhole)
2016
 91 Days (Mad Mack)
 Durarara!!x2 Ketsu (Ran Izumii)
 Haruchika: Haruta & Chika (Matsuda)
2017
 Kirakira PreCure a la Mode (Hotto, Bitard, Spongen)
 One Piece (Charlotte Mont-d'Or)
 Knight's & Magic (David Hepken)
 My Hero Academia (Juzo Honenuki)
2019
 Afterlost (Jack)
2021
 That Time I Got Reincarnated as a Slime (Middray)
2022
Tokyo 24th Ward (Yamamori)
Salaryman's Club (Kohji Matsushita)
Shinobi no Ittoki (Gantetsu Suzunone)
2023
Edens Zero Season 2 (Daichi)

Original video animation
 Bludgeoning Angel Dokuro-Chan (Umezawa)
 Carnival Phantasm (Kunifuji, Sasaki Battōsai)
 Ichi the Killer: Episode 0 (Nobuo)
 Kirameki Project (Kikuchi, Schmidt)
 Maria Watches Over Us Season 3 (Gensuke Sawamura)
 Saint Seiya: The Lost Canvas (Worm Raimi)
 ShootFighter Tekken (Mikunino)
 Transformers: Go! (Judōra)

Original web animation
 Ninja Slayer From Animation (Yamahiro)
 Wonder Momo (Glooder)

Tokusatsu
2008
 Engine Sentai Go-onger (Savage Sky Barbaric Machine Beast Heater Banki (ep. 34))
2010
 Tensou Sentai Goseiger (Yuumajuu Elmgaim of the Baku (ep. 30))
2011
 Kamen Rider OOO (UniArmadillo Yummy (ep. 37))
2014
 Ressha Sentai ToQger (Bomb Shadow (ep. 8))
2015
 Shuriken Sentai Ninninger (Westein Yokai Dracula (ep. 24 - 25))
2016
 Kamen Rider Ghost (Hikoki Ganma Brothers (ep. 26 (Elder), 25 - 26 (Younger)), Hikoki Ganma Perfect (ep. 36))

Video games
 Fu-un Bakumatsu-den (Sōma Tonomo)
 Izuna: Legend of the Unemployed Ninja (Utsuho)
 JoJo's Bizarre Adventure: All Star Battle (Rudol von Stroheim)
 JoJo's Bizarre Adventure: Eyes of Heaven (Rudol von Stroheim)
 Kobayashi ga Kawai Sugite Tsurai!! (Kagetsuna Sanada)
 Overwatch (Winston)
 Princess Maker 5 (Hitoshi Kuroda)
 Sengoku Basara 2 (Naoe Kanetsugu)
 Sengoku Basara 4 (Naoe Kanetsugu)
 Sengoku Basara: Samurai Heroes (Naoe Kanetsugu)
 Super Street Fighter IV (Adon)
 Ultra Street Fighter IV (Adon)
 Way of the Samurai 2 (Gunji Dojima)
 Way of the Samurai 3 (Gunji Dojima, Dr. Genan)
 Way of the Samurai 4 (Gunji Dojima)
Sdorica (Dylan Levon, Dylan SP, Karnulla)
 Fire Emblem: Three Houses (Jeritza, Death Knight)

Dubbing

Live-action
 10,000 BC (Moha)
 24 (Rick Burke, Kevin Wade)
 300: Rise of an Empire (General Bandari (Ashraf Barhom))
 Adventureland (Joel (Martin Starr))
 Alien Siege (Leon)
 The Baytown Outlaws (McQueen Oodie)
 The Bourne Ultimatum (Paz)
 Casa de los Babys (Don Mercurio)
 Casa de Mi Padre (Raúl Álvarez)
 Coach Carter (Oscar)
 The Da Vinci Code (Youth on Bus (Shane Zaza))
 The Dark Knight (Lau, Bank Manager)
 Fat Albert (Bill Cosby Jr. (Keith Robinson))
 Ghost Whisperer (Julian Borgia)
 Guardians of the Galaxy Vol. 2 (Howard the Duck)
 Hawaii Five-0 (Ray Mapes)
 Hotel Rwanda (Dube)
 I'll Always Know What You Did Last Summer (Roger Pack)
 The Interpreter (Doug)
 King Kong (Jimmy)
 Lost (Caesar)
 Million Dollar Baby (Omar)
 Minority Report (Lt. Will Blake)
 Pee Mak (Puak)
 Power Rangers Mystic Force (Imperious)
 Power Rangers Samurai (Antonio Garcia)
 Project Runway (Collier Strong)
 The Road to Guantánamo (Shafiq Rasul)
 Rush (Anthony 'Bubbles' Horsley (Julian Rhind-Tutt))
 The Seeker (James Stanton)
 Sesame Street (Count von Count)
 Superman Returns (Stanford (Kal Penn))
 Terminator Genisys (Danny Dyson)
 Ultimate Force (Corporal Ricky Mann)

Animation
 Arthur and the Revenge of Maltazard (Max)
 Dead End: Paranormal Park (Pugsley)
 Gravity Falls (Soos)
 Rio (Luiz)
 Rio 2 (Luiz)
 Transformers: Animated (Cliffjumper, Highbrow, Ironhide(Japanese:Armor Hide), Warpath, Oil-Slick)
 Transformers: Prime (Breakdown)(Japanese:War Breakdown)

References

External links
 Mausu Promotion profile
 

1972 births
Japanese male video game actors
Japanese male voice actors
Living people
Male voice actors from Gunma Prefecture
21st-century Japanese male actors
Mausu Promotion voice actors